Chan Chin-wei and Xu Yifan were the defending champions, however they lost to the third seeds Hiroko Kuwata and Junri Namigata in the semifinals.

The fourth seeds Eri Hozumi and Makoto Ninomiya won the title, defeating Kuwata and Namigata in an all-Japanese final, 6–3, 6–7(2–7), [10–2].

Seeds

Draw

References 
 Draw

Blossom Cup - Doubles
Industrial Bank Cup